The Strategic Defence and Security Review (SDSR) refers to two of the defence strategy policy reviews of the United Kingdom:

 Strategic Defence and Security Review 2010
 Strategic Defence and Security Review 2015